B.A.S.I.C. is the fifth studio album by The Basics. It was released on 22 November 2019, and contains a variety of original songs written by the band, and cover versions from artists such as The Beatles and Chuck Berry.

The album was recorded at The Barn, a converted studio at Wally De Backer's parents' farm in the Mornington Peninsula. The release was put together entirely by the band, including recording, production, mixing and presentation.

The record was made available for purchase as a digital download (via the band's Bandcamp online store front) and limited edition CD, a vinyl record, and cassette tape formats.

The album was launched with a one-off gig on 21 November 2019 at the Gershwin Room at Melbourne's Esplanade Hotel.

The album had working titles of Faxing Zimbabwe and Game Over.

Track listing

Charts

References

External links

2019 albums
The Basics albums